Charles E. Wilson (1840August 15, 1915) was an American soldier and recipient of the Medal of Honor during the American Civil War.

Biography 
Wilson was born in 1840 in Bucks County, Pennsylvania and died August 15, 1915 in Trenton, New Jersey. During the Civil War he enlisted in the 1st New Jersey Cavalry and served as a Sergeant. He earned his medal in the Battle of Sayler's Creek, Virginia on April 6, 1865. The medal was presented to him on July 3, 1865.

Medal of Honor citation

References 

1840 births
1915 deaths
American Civil War recipients of the Medal of Honor